Results of India national football team from 1980-1989.

1981

1982

1984

1985

1986

1987

1988

1989

See also
Indian women's national football team results (1980–1989)
India national football team results (1970–1979)
India national football team results (1990–1999)
History of the India national football team

References

Football
1980